A  is a sacred religious palanquin (also translated as portable Shinto shrine). Shinto followers believe that it serves as the vehicle to transport a deity in Japan while moving between main shrine and temporary shrine during a festival or when moving to a new shrine. Often, the mikoshi resembles a miniature building, with pillars, walls, a roof, a veranda and a railing.

Often the Japanese honorific prefix  is added, making .

Shapes 

Typical shapes are rectangles, hexagons, and octagons. The body, which stands on two or four poles (for carrying), is usually lavishly decorated, and the roof might hold a carving of a phoenix.

Festival and flow 
During a matsuri (Japanese festival) involving a mikoshi, people bear the mikoshi on their shoulders by means of two, four (or sometimes, rarely, six) poles. They bring the mikoshi from the shrine, carry it around the neighborhoods that worship at the shrine, and in many cases leave it in a designated area, resting on blocks called uma (horse), for a time before returning it to the shrine. Some shrines have the custom of dipping the mikoshi in the water of a nearby lake, river or ocean (this practice is called o-hamaori). At some festivals, the people who bear the mikoshi wave it wildly from side to side to "amuse" the deity (kami) inside.

Methods of shouldering 
Bearers chant  and may or may not toss and shake the mikoshi.

Other methods include:

  is one famous way of shouldering observable at the Asakusa Sanja Festival. The shout is "say ya, soi ya, sah, sorya... etc". The mikoshi is swayed rapidly, up and down and a little to the right and left.
 "Dokkoi | ドッコイ " is seen in Shonan in Kanagawa Prefecture. This shouldering style usually uses two poles. The mikoshi is moved up and down rhythmically, and more slowly than in the "Edomae style". One shout is "dokkoi dokkoi dokkoi sorya" and there is a song called a "Jink | lively song."
 Another one is "Odawara style | 小田原担ぎ " observed in Odawara (next to the Hakone). This is a peculiar way of shouldering in which multiple mikoshis meet and run (Holy Dash). The shout is "oisah;korasah/koryasah." and there is a song called a "Kiyari", a chant traditionally sung by workmen while pulling a heavy load and also by firemen. The bearers do not sway the mikoshi.
 In this "united" style, the mikoshi uses the full width of the road, moving from side to side and turning corners at full speed.

See also
Glossary of Shinto
Honden
Matsuri Float

References 

 Sokyo Ono, William P. Woodward, Shinto - The Kami Way, Charles E. Tuttle Company, Tokyo 1992, 
 Basic Terms of Shinto, Kokugakuin University, Institute for Japanese Culture and Classics, Tokyo 1985

External links 
Mikoshi Photos of Shinto shrine (English version)
Mikoshi Festival
Shin'yo, in the Encyclopedia of Shinto by the Kokugakuin University

Festivals in Japan
Japanese folk art
Shinto shrines
Articles containing video clips
Shinto religious objects
Traditional rituals of East Asia